WUSZ "Radio USA" (99.9 FM) is a U.S. radio station in Hibbing, Minnesota, serving the Iron Range region. The station airs country music, and is owned by Midwest Communications.

Sister Stations
Midwest also owns Seven radio stations on the Iron Range; WMFG, WMFG-FM, WNMT, WTBX, WEVE-FM, WDKE and WUSZ. All Seven stations share the same studio location at 807 W. 37th Street, Hibbing.

External links
99.9 Radio USA official website

Radio stations in Minnesota
Country radio stations in the United States
Radio stations established in 1958
1958 establishments in Minnesota
Midwest Communications radio stations